Horní Poustevna is a railway station in the village of Horní Poustevna, Ústí nad Labem Region, Czech Republic. The station is now served by České dráhy in cooperation with DB Regio: the National Park Railway. This service connects Děčín and Rumburk via Bad Schandau and Sebnitz.

Train services
The station is served by the following services:

Osobní (local stopping service) Děčín hl.n. – Bad Schandau – Sebnitz – Dolní Poustevna – Mikulášovice – Rumburk

References

External links
Czech Railways website

Railway stations in Ústí nad Labem Region